Mutilated Genitals is a promotional EP by Dog Fashion Disco released in 2001. It has since been deleted and is quite rare, but not as rare as Erotic Massage. The title comes from a quote from the song "Valley Girl Ventriloquist", "Don't fall asleep or we'll mutilate your genitals".

Track listing

The versions of tracks 4 and 5 are re-recordings; they would appear on the 2002 reissue of Anarchists of Good Taste.

References

Dog Fashion Disco albums
2001 EPs